Avazabad (also Romanized as ‘Avaẕābād) is a village in Nakhlestan Rural District, in the Central District of Kahnuj County, Kerman Province, Iran. At the 2006 census, its population was 658, in 137 families.

References 

Populated places in Kahnuj County